John Stanton Fleming Morrison DFC (17 April 1892 – 28 January 1961) was a British golf course architect born in Newcastle-on-Tyne, UK. He worked predominantly with Charles Alison, Harry Colt, and Alister MacKenzie, in 1928 forming Colt, Alison & Morrison Ltd.

John Morrison was educated at Charterhouse School and Trinity College, Cambridge, where his studies in history and law extended from 1912 to 1919, interrupted by his war service. He was a bomber pilot during World War I and a Group Captain in the RAF during World War II. He was among the first pilots to land an airplane on an aircraft carrier. He was awarded the DFC and bar.

In his younger years he was a talented all-round sportsman, representing England at football as an amateur and playing first-class cricket with Cambridge University and Somerset. He won Blues for cricket, football and golf. He also won the Belgian Amateur Golf Championship in 1929. In 1914 he scored 233 not out for Cambridge against Marylebone Cricket Club, batting for only 165 minutes. At the time it was a record first-class score for Cambridge and a record for the Fenner's ground.

He became the managing director of Colt, Alison and Morrison in 1952 after his partners died, and remained in that position until his death in 1961. He married twice, and had one daughter.

References

External links
Colt Association Official Site
 
CricketArchive: John Morrison

Golf course architects
Royal Air Force group captains
Sportspeople from Newcastle upon Tyne
People educated at Charterhouse School
Alumni of Trinity College, Cambridge
English cricketers
Cambridge University cricketers
Somerset cricketers
England amateur international footballers
1892 births
1961 deaths
Free Foresters cricketers
Gentlemen cricketers
Marylebone Cricket Club cricketers
Oxford and Cambridge Universities cricketers
Brentford F.C. players
Southern Football League players
Sunderland A.F.C. players
English Football League players
Association football forwards
Northumberland cricketers
H. D. G. Leveson Gower's XI cricketers
Recipients of the Distinguished Flying Cross (United Kingdom)
Demobilised Officers cricketers
P. F. Warner's XI cricketers
English footballers
Royal Air Force personnel of World War I
Royal Air Force personnel of World War II